The boulet à la liégeoise (or more regionally called boulet sauce lapin, boulet (sauce) chasseur, or Boulets) is a Belgian dish made from balls of mixed minced pork and beef in a sweet-sour sauce.    As its name indicates, the dish comes from the city of Liège in Wallonia.

Description
As with most regional recipes, each cook will have a slightly different variation on how to make the dish.  Traditionally, boulet à la liégeoise consists of one or two big meatballs (the size of the ball allows one to differentiate a boulet from the smaller boulette), made from pork and veal or pork and beef minced meat, bread crumbs, onions and parsley. The balls are then cooked in a pan until golden brown before lowering the heat and letting the meat simmer in a sweet and sour sauce made from onions, vinegar, brown sugar, Liège syrup and Corinthian raisins. The sauce is called sauce lapin (literally "rabbit sauce"), not because of any rabbit in the sauce but after Madame Géraldine Lapin, born Corthouts, wife of Ernest Lapin (1868–1922), a tax collector in the suburbs of Liège.

A true institution in brasseries and friteries throughout Liège, and known nationwide, this dish is traditionally served with French fries (it is then called boulets-frites), mayonnaise, and lightly seasoned crudités or apple sauce. 

Many establishments in Liège serve this dish as almost their only speciality. Most restaurants and friteries in Liège serve it. One company makes it industrially.

The Gay Boulet Brotherhood and the Diamond Boulet
Since 23 March 1996 the Gay Boulet Brotherhood has awarded a Diamond Boulet to a restaurateur whose recipe is closest to the local tradition.

This award was given, 
 in 1997, to the restaurant Le Bouche à Oreille, in Boncelles
 in 1998, to Friterie des Moges, in Rotheux
 in 1999, to the brasserie Le Lulay Al Copète, in Liège
 in 2000, to the restaurant Le Bouche à Oreille, in Boncelles
 in 2001, no award 
 in 2002, to the restaurant La Liégeoise (chez René), in Ans
 in 2003, to Café Lequet (Chez Stockis), in Liège
 in 2004, to Café Lequet (Chez Stockis), in Liège 
 in 2005, to the restaurant Le Dernier Ragot, rue des Clarisses à Liège 
 in 2006, to Dernier Ragot, Clarisses street in Liège 
 in 2007, to the restaurant Le Vin sur Vin, place du Marché in Liège 
 in 2008, to the brasserie Au Point de vue, place Verte in Liège 
 in 2009, to the friterie Chez Adam, place Reine Astrid in Visé 
 in 2010, to the friterie Chez Adam, place Reine Astrid in Visé, tied with L'Amirauté, quai de l'Ourthe in Tilff
 in 2011, to the restaurant Chez Philippe, Haute-Sauvenière street in Liège
 in 2012, to Friterie du Longdoz, place Sylvain Dupuis 7 in Liège
 in 2013, to the restaurant Chez Pol, route du Condroz 123 in Nandrin
 in 2014, to the brasserie Le Saint-Grégory, Feronstrée 112 in Liège
 in 2015, to the brasserie Au Point de vue, place Verte 20 in Liège
 in 2016, to the brasserie Rive Droite, Esplanade 2 in Chaudfontaine 
 in 2017, to the restaurant Aux Chandelles, route de Herve 187 in Grivegnée

See also

 Wallonia#Cuisine

References

External links
The recipe (Confrérie Gastronomique du Gay Boulet de Boncelles)

Belgian cuisine
Meatballs